There were three railway stations serving Rotherham:

Rotherham Central railway station - closed in 1966 and re-opened in 1987, now Rotherham's only railway station
Rotherham Masborough railway station - Rotherham's only railway station 1966-1987, closed in 1988
Rotherham Westgate Station - closed in 1952

There are several other stations in the Metropolitan Borough of Rotherham